Elisabeth Koning (Elisabeth Goverdina "Lies" Koning, married name van der Stam; 7 November 1917 – 12 February 1975) was a Dutch sprinter. She competed in the women's 100 metres at the 1936 Summer Olympics.

References

External links
 

1917 births
1975 deaths
Athletes (track and field) at the 1936 Summer Olympics
Dutch female sprinters
Olympic athletes of the Netherlands
People from Zandvoort
Olympic female sprinters
Sportspeople from North Holland